Scania perornata is a moth of the family Noctuidae. It is found in the Maule and Biobío Regions of Chile and Bariloche, Neuquén and Chapelco in Argentina.

The wingspan is 29–32 mm. Adults are on wing in March.

External links
 Noctuinae of Chile

Noctuinae
Fauna of Argentina
Fauna of Chile
Moths of South America
Insects of South America